This list of birds of Georgia includes species documented in the U.S. state of Georgia and accepted by the Checklist and Records Committee of the Georgia Ornithological Society (GOSRC). As of August 2020, there are 427 species definitively included in the official list. Seven additional species are on the list but classed as provisional (see definitions below). Of the 427 species, 100 are classed as rare, four have been introduced to North America, and one is extinct. (Another, the ivory-billed woodpecker, is classed by the GOSRC as rare, but is arguably extinct. See its species account for the controversy surrounding this bird.) 

This list is presented in the taxonomic sequence of the Check-list of North and Middle American Birds, 7th edition through the 62nd Supplement, published by the American Ornithological Society (AOS). Common and scientific names are also those of the Check-list, except that the common names of families are from the Clements taxonomy because the AOS list does not include them.

Unless otherwise noted, all species listed below are considered to occur regularly in Georgia as permanent residents, summer or winter visitors, or migrants. The following tags are used to designate some species:

 (R) - Rare - a species whose report is reviewable by the GOSRC
 (I) - Introduced - a species introduced to North America by humans, either directly or indirectly
 (E) - Extinct - a recent species that no longer exists
 (P) - Provisional list - "species with fewer than 4 accepted sight records" per the GOSRC

Ducks, geese, and waterfowl

Order: AnseriformesFamily: Anatidae

The family Anatidae includes the ducks and most duck-like waterfowl, such as geese and swans. These are birds that are adapted for an aquatic existence with webbed feet, bills that are flattened to a greater or lesser extent, and feathers that are excellent at shedding water due to special oils. Forty-one species of Anatidae have been recorded in Georgia.

Black-bellied whistling-duck, Dendrocygna autumnalis
Fulvous whistling-duck, Dendrocygna bicolor (R)
Snow goose, Anser caerulescens
Ross's goose, Anser rossii
Greater white-fronted goose, Anser albifrons
Brant, Branta bernicla (R)
Cackling goose, Branta hutchinsii (R)
Canada goose, Branta canadensis
Trumpeter swan, Cygnus buccinator (R)
Tundra swan, Cygnus columbianus
Wood duck, Aix sponsa
Blue-winged teal, Spatula discors
Cinnamon teal, Spatula cyanoptera (R)
Northern shoveler, Spatula clypeata
Gadwall, Mareca strepera
Eurasian wigeon, Mareca penelope (R)
American wigeon, Mareca americana
Mallard, Anas platyrhynchos
American black duck, Anas rubripes
Mottled duck, Anas fulvigula
Northern pintail, Anas acuta
Green-winged teal, Anas crecca carolinensis
Canvasback, Aythya valisineria
Redhead, Aythya americana
Ring-necked duck, Aythya collaris
Greater scaup, Aythya marila
Lesser scaup, Aythya affinis
King eider, Somateria spectabilis (R)
Common eider, Somateria mollissima (R)
Harlequin duck, Histrionicus histrionicus (R)
Surf scoter, Melanitta perspicillata
White-winged scoter, Melanitta deglandi
Black scoter, Melanitta americana
Long-tailed duck, Clangula hyemalis
Bufflehead, Bucephala albeola
Common goldeneye, Bucephala clangula
Hooded merganser, Lophodytes cucullatus
Common merganser, Mergus merganser (R)
Red-breasted merganser, Mergus serrator
Masked duck, Nomonyx dominicus (R)
Ruddy duck, Oxyura jamaicensis

Guans, chachalacas, and curassows

Order: GalliformesFamily: Cracidae

The chachalacas are tropical fowl native to the Neotropics, only entering into southern Texas in their native range. They were introduced to Sapelo, Blackbeard and Little St. Simons Islands in 1923.

Plain chachalaca, Ortalis vetula (I)

New World quail

Order: GalliformesFamily: Odontophoridae

The New World quails are small, plump terrestrial birds only distantly related to the quails of the Old World, but named for their similar appearance and habits. Only one species of New World quail has been recorded in Georgia

Northern bobwhite, Colinus virginianus

Pheasants, grouse, and allies

Order: GalliformesFamily: Phasianidae

The Phasianidae is the family containing the pheasants and related species. These are terrestrial birds, variable in size but generally plump, with broad, relatively short wings. Many are gamebirds or have been domesticated as a food source for humans. Two species of Phasianidae have been recorded in Georgia.

Wild turkey, Meleagris gallopavo
Ruffed grouse, Bonasa umbellus

Grebes

Order: PodicipediformesFamily: Podicipedidae

Grebes are small to medium-large freshwater diving birds. They have lobed toes and are excellent swimmers and divers. However, they have their feet placed far back on the body, making them quite ungainly on land. Five species of grebe have been recorded in Georgia.

Pied-billed grebe, Podilymbus podiceps
Horned grebe, Podiceps auritus
Red-necked grebe, Podiceps grisegena
Eared grebe, Podiceps nigricollis
Western grebe, Aechmorphorus occidentalis (R)

Pigeons and doves

Order: ColumbiformesFamily: Columbidae

Pigeons and doves are stout-bodied birds with short necks and short slender bills with a fleshy cere. Seven species of columbidae have been recorded in Georgia.

Rock pigeon, Columba livia (I)
Eurasian collared-dove, Streptopelia decaocto (I)
Inca dove, Columbina inca (R)
Passenger pigeon, Ectopistes migratorius (E)
Common ground dove, Columbina passerina
White-winged dove, Zenaida asiatica
Mourning dove, Zenaida macroura

Cuckoos

Order: CuculiformesFamily: Cuculidae

The family Cuculidae includes cuckoos, roadrunners, and anis. These birds are of variable size with slender bodies, long tails, and strong legs. Three species of cuckoo have been recorded in Georgia.

Smooth-billed ani, Crotophaga ani (R)
Yellow-billed cuckoo, Coccyzus americanus
Black-billed cuckoo, Coccyzus erythropthalmus

Nightjars and allies

Order: CaprimulgiformesFamily: Caprimulgidae

Nightjars are medium-sized nocturnal birds that usually nest on the ground. They have long wings, short legs, and very short bills. Most have small feet, of little use for walking, and long pointed wings. Their soft plumage is cryptically colored to resemble bark or leaves. Three species of nightjar have been recorded in Georgia.

Common nighthawk, Chordeiles minor
Chuck-will's-widow, Antrostomus carolinensis
Eastern whip-poor-will, Antrostomus vociferus

Swifts

Order: ApodiformesFamily: Apodidae

The swifts are small birds, spending most of their lives flying. They have very short legs and never settle voluntarily on the ground, perching instead only on vertical surfaces. Many swifts have very long swept-back wings which resemble a crescent or boomerang. One species of swift has been recorded in Georgia.

Chimney swift, Chaetura pelagica

Hummingbirds

Order: ApodiformesFamily: Trochilidae

Hummingbirds are small birds capable of hovering in mid-air due to the rapid flapping of their wings. They are the only birds that can fly backwards. Thirteen species of hummingbird have been recorded in Georgia.

Mexican violetear, Colibri thalassinus (P)
Green-breasted mango, Anthracothorax prevostii (R)
Rivoli's hummingbird, Eugenes fulgens (R)
Blue-throated mountain-gem, Lampornis clemenciae (R)
Ruby-throated hummingbird, Archilochus colubris
Black-chinned hummingbird, Archilochus alexandri
Anna's hummingbird, Calypte anna (R)
Calliope hummingbird, Selasphorus calliope (R)
Rufous hummingbird, Selasphorus rufus
Allen's hummingbird, Selasphorus sasin (R)
Broad-tailed hummingbird, Selasphorus platycercus (R)
Broad-billed hummingbird, Cynanthus latirostris (R)
Buff-bellied hummingbird, Amazila yucatanensis (R)

Rails, gallinules, and coots

Order: GruiformesFamily: Rallidae

The Rallidae is a large family of small to medium-sized birds which includes the rails, crakes, coots, and gallinules. The most typical family members occupy dense vegetation in damp environments near lakes, swamps, or rivers. In general they are shy and secretive, making them difficult to observe. Nine species of rails have been recorded in Georgia.

Clapper rail, Rallus crepitans
King rail, Rallus elegans
Virginia rail, Rallus limicola
Sora, Porzana carolina
Common gallinule, Gallinula galeata
American coot, Fulica americana
Purple gallinule, Porphyrio martinicus
Yellow rail, Coturnicops noveboracensis (R)
Black rail, Laterallus jamaicensis (R)

Limpkin

Order: GruiformesFamily: Aramidae

The limpkin is an odd bird that looks like a large rail, but is skeletally closer to the cranes. It is found in marshes with some trees or scrub in the Caribbean, South America and southern Florida. The family is monotypic, and its sole member has been recorded in Georgia.

Limpkin, Aramus guarauna

Cranes

Order: GruiformesFamily: Gruidae

Cranes are large, long-legged, and long-necked birds. Unlike the similar-looking but unrelated herons, cranes fly with necks extended. Most have elaborate and noisy courtship displays or "dances". Two species of crane have been recorded in Georgia.

Sandhill crane, Antigone canadensis
Whooping crane, Grus americana (R)

Stilts and avocets

Order: CharadriiformesFamily: Recurvirostridae

Recurvirostridae is a family of large wading birds which includes the avocets and stilts. The avocets have long legs and long up-curved bills. The stilts have extremely long legs and long, thin, straight bills. Two species of this family have been recorded in Georgia.

Black-necked stilt, Himantopus mexicanus
American avocet, Recurvirostra americana

Oystercatchers

Order: CharadriiformesFamily: Haematopodidae

The oystercatchers are large, conspicuous, and noisy plover-like birds, with strong bills used for smashing or prising open molluscs. A single species of oystercatcher has been recorded in Georgia.

American oystercatcher, Haematopus palliatus

Lapwings and plovers

Order: CharadriiformesFamily: Charadriidae

The family Charadriidae includes the plovers, dotterels, and lapwings. They are small to medium-sized birds with compact bodies, short thick necks, and long, usually pointed, wings. They are generally found in open country, mostly in habitats near water. Eight species of Charadriidae have been definitively recorded in Georgia and another has been classed as provisional.

Northern lapwing, Vanellus vanellus (R)
Black-bellied plover, Pluvialis squatarola
American golden-plover, Pluviali dominicas 
Killdeer, Charadrius vociferus
Semipalmated plover, Charadrius semipalmatus
Piping plover, Charadrius melodus
Wilson's plover, Charadrius wilsonia
Snowy plover, Charadrius nivosus (R)
Mountain plover, Charadrius montanus (P)

Sandpipers and allies

Order: CharadriiformesFamily: Scolopacidae

Scolopacidae is a large and diverse family of small to medium-sized shorebirds. Most eat small invertebrates picked out of the mud or sand. Different lengths of legs and bills enable multiple species to feed in the same habitat, particularly on the coast, without direct competition for food. thirty-two species of scolopacidae have been recorded in Georgia.

Upland sandpiper, Bartramia longicauda
Whimbrel, Numenius phaeopus
Long-billed curlew, Numenius americanus
Hudsonian godwit, Limosa haemastica (R)
Marbled godwit, Limosa fedoa
Ruddy turnstone, Arenaria interpres
Red knot, Calidris canutus
Ruff, Calidris pugnax (R)
Stilt sandpiper, Calidris himantopus
Curlew sandpiper, Calidris ferruginea (R)
Sanderling, Calidris alba
Dunlin, Calidris alpina
Purple sandpiper, Calidris maritima
Baird's sandpiper, Calidris bairdii
Least sandpiper, Calidris minutilla
White-rumped sandpiper, Calidris fuscicollis
Buff-breasted sandpiper, Calidris subruficollis
Pectoral sandpiper, Calidris melanotos
Semipalmated sandpiper, Calidris pusilla
Western sandpiper, Calidris mauri
Short-billed dowitcher, Limnodromus griseus
Long-billed dowitcher, Limnodromus scolopaceus
American woodcock, Scolopax minor
Wilson's snipe, Gallinago delicata
Spotted sandpiper, Actitis macularius
Solitary sandpiper, Tringa solitaria
Lesser yellowlegs, Tringa flavipes
Willet, Tringa semipalmata
Greater yellowlegs, Tringa melanoleuca
Wilson's phalarope, Phalaropus tricolor
Red-necked phalarope, Phalaropus lobatus
Red phalarope, Phalaropus fulicarius

Skuas and jaegers

Order: CharadriiformesFamily: Stercorariidae

Skuas and jaegers are medium to large seabirds, typically with gray or brown plumage, often with white markings on the wings. They have longish bills with hooked tips and webbed feet with sharp claws. They look like large dark gulls, but have a fleshy cere above the upper mandible. They are strong, acrobatic fliers. Four species of the family have been recorded in Georgia.

South polar skua, Stercorarius maccormicki (R)
Pomarine jaeger, Stercorarius pomarinus
Parasitic jaeger, Stercorarius parasiticus
Long-tailed jaeger, Stercorarius longicaudus (R)

Auks, murres, and puffins

Order: CharadriiformesFamily: Alcidae

Alcids (auks and their relatives) are superficially similar to penguins due to their black-and-white colors, their upright posture, and some of their habits; however they are not closely related to penguins and are (with one extinct exception) able to fly. Auks live on the open sea, only deliberately coming ashore to breed. Two species of auk have been recorded in Georgia.

Dovekie, Alle alle (R)
Razorbill, Alca torda

Gulls, terns, and skimmers

Order: CharadriiformesFamily: Laridae

The Laridae are a family of medium to large seabirds containing the gulls, terns, and skimmers. They are typically gray or white, often with black markings on the head or wings. They have stout, longish bills and webbed feet. Twenty-eight species of larids have been definitively recorded in Georgia and two more are classed as provisional.

Black-legged kittiwake, Rissa tridactyla (R)
Ivory gull, Pagophila eburnea (R)
Sabine's gull, Xema sabini (R)
Bonaparte's gull, Chroicocephalus philadelphia
Black-headed gull, Chroicocephalus ridibundus (R)
Little gull, Hydrocoleus minutus (R)
Laughing gull, Leucophaeus atricilla
Franklin's gull, Leucophaeus pipixcan
Ring-billed gull, Larus delawarensis
California gull, Larus californicus (R)
Herring gull, Larus argentatus
Iceland gull, Larus glaucoides (R)
Lesser black-backed gull, Larus fuscus
Glaucous gull, Larus hyperboreus
Great black-backed gull, Larus marinus
Brown noddy, Anous stolidus (R)
Sooty tern, Onychoprion fuscata
Bridled tern, Onychoprion anaethetus
Least tern, Sternula antillarum
Gull-billed tern, Gelochelidon nilotica
Caspian tern, Hydroprogne caspia
Black tern, Chlidonias niger
White-winged tern, Chlidonias leucopterus (P)
Roseate tern, Sterna dougallii (P)
Common tern, Sterna hirundo
Arctic tern, Sterna paradisaea (R)
Forster's tern, Sterna forsteri
Royal tern, Thalasseus maxima
Sandwich tern, Thalasseus sandvicensis
Black skimmer, Rynchops niger

Tropicbirds

Order: PhaethontiformesFamily: Phaethontidae

Tropicbirds are slender white birds of tropical oceans with exceptionally long central tail feathers. Their long wings have black markings, as does the head. Two species of tropicbirds have been recorded in Georgia.

White-tailed tropicbird, Phaethon lepturus (R)
Red-billed tropicbird, Phaeton aethereus (R)

Loons

Order: GaviiformesFamily: Gaviidae

Loons are aquatic birds the size of a large duck, to which they are unrelated. With mostly black plumage and spear-shaped bills, loons swim well and fly adequately, but because their legs are placed towards the rear of the body, are clumsy on land. Four species of loons have occurred in Georgia.

Red-throated loon, Gavia stellata
Pacific loon, Gavia pacifica (R)
Common loon, Gavia immer
Yellow-billed loon, Gavia adamsii (R)

Southern storm-petrels

Order: ProcellariiformesFamily: Oceanitidae

The storm-petrels are the smallest seabirds, relatives of the petrels, feeding on planktonic crustaceans and small fish picked from the surface, typically while hovering. The flight is fluttering and sometimes bat-like. Until 2018, this family's three species were included with the other storm-petrels in family Hydrobatidae. One species of this family has been recorded in Georgia.

Wilson's storm-petrel, Oceanites oceanicus

Northern storm-petrels
Order: ProcellariiformesFamily: Hydrobatidae

Though the members of this family are similar in many respects to the southern storm-petrels, including their general appearance and habits, there are enough genetic differences to warrant their placement in a separate family. Two species of this storm-petrel family have been recorded in Georgia.

Leach's storm-petrel, Hydrobates leucorhous (R)
Band-rumped storm-petrel, Hydrobates castro (R)

Shearwaters and petrels

Order: ProcellariiformesFamily: Procellariidae

The procellariids are the main group of medium-sized "true petrels", characterized by united tubular nostrils with a median septum. Six species of procellarids have been definitively recorded in Georgia and another has been classed as provisional.

Northern fulmar, Fulmarus glacialis  (P)
Black-capped petrel, Pterodoma hasitata
Cory's shearwater, Calonectris diomedea
Sooty shearwater, Ardenna griseus (R)
Great shearwater, Ardenna gravis
Manx shearwater, Puffinus puffinus
Audubon's shearwater, Puffinus lherminieri

Storks

Order: CiconiiformesFamily: Ciconiidae

Storks are large, heavy, long-legged, long-necked wading birds with long stout bills and wide wingspans. They lack the powder down that other wading birds such as herons, spoonbills and ibises use to clean off fish slime. Storks lack a syrinx and are mute. A single species of stork has been recorded in Georgia.

Wood stork, Mycteria americana

Frigatebirds

Order: SuliformesFamily: Fregatidae

Frigatebirds are large seabirds usually found over tropical oceans. They are large, black, or black and white, with long wings and deeply forked tails. The males have colored inflatable throat pouches. One species of frigatebird has been recorded in Georgia.

Magnificent frigatebird, Fregata magnificens

Boobies and gannets

Order: SuliformesFamily: Sulidae

The sulids comprise the gannets and boobies. Both groups are medium-large coastal seabirds that plunge-dive for fish. Four species of sulid have been recorded in Georgia.

Masked booby, Sula dactylatra (R)
Brown booby, Sula leucogaster (R)
Red-footed booby, Sula sula (R)
Northern gannet, Morus bassanus

Anhingas

Order: SuliformesFamily: Anhingidae

Anhingas are cormorant-like water birds with very long necks and long, straight beaks. They are fish eaters which often swim with only their neck above the water. One species of anhingidae has been recorded in Georgia.

Anhinga, Anhinga anhinga

Cormorants and shags

Order: SuliformesFamily: Phalacrocoracidae

Cormorants are medium-to-large aquatic birds, usually with mainly dark plumage and areas of colored skin on the face. The bill is long, thin, and sharply hooked. Two species of cormorant have been recorded in Georgia.

Great cormorant, Phalacrocorax carbo (R)
Double-crested cormorant, Nannopterum auritum

Pelicans

Order: PelecaniformesFamily: Pelecanidae

Pelicans are very large water birds with a distinctive pouch under their beak. Like other birds in the order Pelecaniformes, they have four webbed toes. Both species of pelican that occur in North America have been recorded in Georgia.

American white pelican, Pelecanus erythrorhynchos
Brown pelican, Pelecanus occidentalis

Herons, egrets, and bitterns

Order: PelecaniformesFamily: Ardeidae

The family Ardeidae contains the herons, egrets, and bitterns. Herons and egrets are medium to large wading birds with long necks and legs. Bitterns tend to be shorter necked and more secretive. Twelve species of bitterns, herons, and egrets have been recorded in Georgia.

American bittern, Botaurus lentiginosus
Least bittern, Ixobrychus exilis
Great blue heron, Ardea herodias
Great egret, Ardea alba
Snowy egret, Egretta thula
Little blue heron, Egretta caerulea
Tricolored heron, Egretta tricolor
Reddish egret, Egretta rufescens
Cattle egret, Bubulcus ibis
Green heron, Butorides virescens
Black-crowned night-heron, Nycticorax nycticorax
Yellow-crowned night-heron, Nyctanassa violacea

Ibises and spoonbills

Order: PelecaniformesFamily: Threskiornithidae

The family Threskiornithidae includes the ibises and spoonbills. They have long, broad wings; the bill is also long, decurved in the case of the ibises, straight and distinctively flattened in the spoonbills. Three species of ibis and a single species of spoonbill have been recorded in Georgia.

White ibis, Eudocimus albus
Glossy ibis, Plegadis falcinellus
White-faced ibis, Plegadis chihi (R)
Roseate spoonbill, Platalea ajaja

New World vultures

Order: CathartiformesFamily: Cathartidae

New World vultures are not closely related to Old World vultures, but superficially resemble them because of convergent evolution. Like the Old World vultures, they are scavengers; however, unlike Old World vultures, which find carcasses by sight, New World vultures have a good sense of smell with which they locate carcasses. Two species of New World vulture have been recorded in Georgia.

Black vulture, Coragyps atratus
Turkey vulture, Cathartes aura

Osprey

Order: AccipitriformesFamily: Pandionidae

Pandionidae is a family of fish-eating birds of prey, possessing a very large, powerful hooked beak for tearing flesh from their prey, strong legs, powerful talons, and keen eyesight. The family is monotypic; its sole member, the osprey, has been recorded in Georgia.

Osprey, Pandion haliaetus

Hawks, eagles, and kites

Order: AccipitriformesFamily: Accipitridae

Accipitridae is a family of birds of prey that includes hawks, eagles, kites, harriers, and Old World vultures. They have very large, hooked beaks for tearing flesh from their prey, strong legs, powerful talons, and keen eyesight. Thirteen species of this family have been definitively recorded in Georgia and another has been classed as provisional.

Swallow-tailed kite, Elanoides forficatus
Golden eagle, Aquila chrysaetos
Northern harrier, Circus hudsonius
Sharp-shinned hawk, Accipiter striatus
Cooper's hawk, Accipiter cooperii
Northern goshawk, Accipiter gentilis (R)
Bald eagle, Haliaeetus leucocephalus
Mississippi kite, Ictinia mississippiensis
Red-shouldered hawk, Buteo lineatus
Short-tailed hawk, Buteo brachyurus (R)
Broad-winged hawk, Buteo platypterus
Swainson's hawk, Buteo swainsoni (P)
Red-tailed hawk, Buteo jamaicensis
Rough-legged hawk, Buteo lagopus (R)

Barn-owls

Order: StrigiformesFamily: Tytonidae

Barn-owls are medium to large owls with large heads and characteristic heart-shaped faces. They have long strong legs with powerful talons. A single species of barn-owl has been recorded in Georgia.

Barn owl, Tyto alba

Owls

Order: StrigiformesFamily: Strigidae

Typical owls are small to large solitary nocturnal birds of prey. They have large forward-facing eyes and ears, a hawk-like beak, and a conspicuous circle of feathers around each eye called a facial disk. Eight species of owl have been recorded in Georgia.

Eastern screech-owl, Megascops asio
Great horned owl, Bubo virginianus
Snowy owl, Bubo scandiacus (R)
Burrowing owl, Athene cunicularia (R)
Barred owl, Strix varia
Long-eared owl, Asio otus (R)
Short-eared owl, Asio flammeus
Northern saw-whet owl, Aegolius acadicus (R)

Kingfishers

Order: CoraciiformesFamily: Alcedinidae

Kingfishers are medium-sized birds with large heads, long pointed bills, short legs, and stubby tails. One species of kingfisher has been recorded in Georgia.

Belted kingfisher, Megaceryle alcyon

Woodpeckers

Order: PiciformesFamily: Picidae

Woodpeckers are small to medium-sized birds with chisel-like beaks, short legs, stiff tails, and long tongues used for capturing insects. Some species have feet with two toes pointing forward and two backward, while several species have only three toes. Many woodpeckers have the habit of tapping noisily on tree trunks with their beaks. Nine species of woodpecker have been recorded in Georgia.

Red-headed woodpecker, Melanerpes erythrocephalus
Red-bellied woodpecker, Melanerpes carolinus
Yellow-bellied sapsucker, Sphyrapicus varius
Downy woodpecker, Dryobates pubescens
Red-cockaded woodpecker, Dryobates borealis
Hairy woodpecker, Dryobates villosus
Northern flicker, Colaptes auratus
Pileated woodpecker, Dryocopus pileatus
Ivory-billed woodpecker, Campephilus principalis (R) (E?)

Falcons and caracaras

Order: FalconiformesFamily: Falconidae

The Falconidae is a family of diurnal birds of prey containing the falcons and caracaras. They differ from hawks, eagles, and kites in that they kill with their beaks instead of their talons. Four species of falcon have been recorded in Georgia.

Crested caracara, Caracara plancus (R)
American kestrel, Falco sparverius
Merlin, Falco columbarius
Peregrine falcon, Falco peregrinus

Tyrant flycatchers

Order: PasseriformesFamily: Tyrannidae

Tyrant flycatchers are passerines which occur throughout North and South America. They superficially resemble the Old World flycatchers, but are more robust and have stronger bills. They do not have the sophisticated vocal capabilities of the songbirds. Most, but not all, are rather plain. As the name implies, most are insectivorous. Eighteen species of tyrant flycatcher have been recorded in Georgia.

Ash-throated flycatcher, Myiarchus cinerascens (R)
Great crested flycatcher, Myiarchus crinitus
Tropical kingbird, Tyrannus melancholicus (R)
Western kingbird, Tyrannus verticalis
Eastern kingbird, Tyrannus tyrannus
Gray kingbird, Tyrannus dominicensis
Scissor-tailed flycatcher, Tyrannus forficatus
Olive-sided flycatcher, Contopus cooperi
Eastern wood-pewee, Contopus virens
Yellow-bellied flycatcher, Empidonax flaviventris
Acadian flycatcher, Empidonax virescens
Alder flycatcher, Empidonax alnorum
Willow flycatcher, Empidonax traillii
Least flycatcher, Empidonax minimus
Dusky flycatcher, Empidonax oberholseri (R)
Eastern phoebe, Sayornis phoebe
Say's phoebe, Sayornis saya (R)

Vireos, shrike-babblers, and erpornis
Order: PasseriformesFamily: Vireonidae

The vireos are a group of small to medium-sized passerines. They are typically greenish in color and resemble wood-warblers apart from their heavier bills. Seven species of vireo have been recorded in Georgia.

White-eyed vireo, Vireo griseus
Bell's vireo, Vireo bellii (R)
Yellow-throated vireo, Vireo flavifrons
Blue-headed vireo, Vireo solitarius
Philadelphia vireo, Vireo philadelphicus
Warbling vireo, Vireo gilvus
Red-eyed vireo, Vireo olivaceus

Shrikes

Order: PasseriformesFamily: Laniidae

Shrikes are passerines known for their habit of catching other birds and small animals and impaling the uneaten portions of their bodies on thorns. A shrike's beak is hooked, like that of a typical bird of prey. One species of shrike has been recorded in Georgia.

Loggerhead shrike, Lanius ludovicianus

Crows, jays, and magpies

Order: PasseriformesFamily: Corvidae

The family Corvidae includes crows, ravens, jays, choughs, magpies, treepies, nutcrackers, and ground jays. Corvids are above average in size among the Passeriformes, and some of the larger species show high levels of intelligence. Five species of corvids have been recorded in Georgia.

Blue jay, Cyanocitta cristata
Florida scrub-jay, Aphelocoma coerulescens (R)
American crow, Corvus brachyrhynchos
Fish crow, Corvus ossifragus
Common raven, Corvus corax

Tits, chickadees, and titmice

Order: PasseriformesFamily: Paridae

The Paridae are mainly small stocky woodland species with short stout bills. Some have crests. They are adaptable birds, with a mixed diet including seeds and insects. Two species of parids have been recorded in Georgia.

Carolina chickadee, Poecile carolinensis
Tufted titmouse, Baeolophus bicolor

Larks

Order: PasseriformesFamily: Alaudidae

Larks are small terrestrial birds with often extravagant songs and display flights. Most larks are fairly dull in appearance. Their food is insects and seeds. One species of lark has been recorded in Georgia.

Horned lark, Eremophila alpestris

Swallows

Order: PasseriformesFamily: Hirundinidae

The family Hirundinidae is adapted to aerial feeding. They have a slender streamlined body, long pointed wings, and a short bill with a wide gape. The feet are adapted to perching rather than walking, and the front toes are partly joined at the base. Seven species of swallows have been recorded in Georgia.

Bank swallow, Riparia riparia
Tree swallow, Tachycineta bicolor
Northern rough-winged swallow, Stelgidopteryx serripennis
Purple martin, Progne subis
Barn swallow, Hirundo rustica
Cliff swallow, Petrochelidon pyrrhonota
Cave swallow, Petrochelidon fulva (R)

Kinglets

Order: PasseriformesFamily: Regulidae

The kinglets are a small family of birds which resemble the titmice. They are very small insectivorous birds in the genus Regulus. The adults have colored crowns, giving rise to their name. Two species of kinglet have been recorded in Georgia.

Ruby-crowned kinglet, Corthylio calendula
Golden-crowned kinglet, Regulus satrapa

Waxwings

Order: PasseriformesFamily: Bombycillidae

The waxwings are a group of passerine birds with soft silky plumage and unique red tips to some of the wing feathers. In the Bohemian and cedar waxwings, these tips look like sealing wax and give the group its name. These are arboreal birds of northern forests. They live on insects in summer and berries in winter. One species of waxwing has been recorded in Georgia.

Cedar waxwing, Bombycilla cedrorum

Nuthatches

Order: PasseriformesFamily: Sittidae

Nuthatches are small woodland birds. They have the unusual ability to climb down trees head first, unlike most other birds which can only go upwards. Nuthatches have big heads, short tails, and powerful bills and feet. Three species of nuthatches have been recorded in Georgia.

Red-breasted nuthatch, Sitta canadensis
White-breasted nuthatch, Sitta carolinensis
Brown-headed nuthatch, Sitta pusilla

Treecreepers
Order: PasseriformesFamily: Certhiidae

Treecreepers are small woodland birds, brown above and white below. They have thin pointed down-curved bills, which they use to extricate insects from bark. They have stiff tail feathers, like woodpeckers, which they use to support themselves on vertical trees. A single species of treecreeper has been recorded in Georgia.

Brown creeper, Certhia americana

Gnatcatchers

Order: PasseriformesFamily: Polioptilidae

The family Polioptilidae is a group of small insectivorous passerine birds containing the gnatcatchers and gnatwrens. One species of gnatcatcher has been recorded in Georgia.

Blue-gray gnatcatcher, Polioptila caerulea

Wrens

Order: PasseriformesFamily: Troglodytidae

Wrens are small and inconspicuous birds, except for their loud songs. They have short wings and thin down-turned bills. Several species often hold their tails upright. All are insectivorous. Six species of wren have been recorded in Georgia.

House wren, Troglodytes aedon
Winter wren, Troglodytes hyemalis
Sedge wren, Cistothorus platensis
Marsh wren, Cistothorus palustris
Carolina wren, Thryothorus ludovicianus
Bewick's wren, Thryomanes bewickii (R)

Mockingbirds and thrashers

Order: PasseriformesFamily: Mimidae

The Mimidae, or mimic thrushes, are a family of passerine birds which includes thrashers, mockingbirds, tremblers, and the New World catbirds. They are notable for their vocalization, especially their remarkable ability to mimic a wide variety of birds and other sounds heard outdoors. Four species of mimic thrush have been recorded in Georgia.

Gray catbird, Dumetella carolinensis
Brown thrasher, Toxostoma rufum
Sage thrasher, Oreoscoptes montanus (R)
Northern mockingbird, Mimus polyglottos

Starlings

Order: PasseriformesFamily: Sturnidae

Starlings are small to medium-sized passerines with strong feet. Their flight is strong and direct and they are very gregarious. Their preferred habitat is open country, and they eat insects and fruit. Their plumage is typically dark with a metallic sheen. A single species of starling is established in Georgia.

European starling, Sturnus vulgaris (I)

Thrushes and allies

Order: PasseriformesFamily: Turdidae

The thrushes are a group of passerine birds that occur mainly but not exclusively in the Old World. They are plump, soft plumaged, small to medium-sized insectivores or sometimes omnivores, often feeding on the ground. Many have attractive songs. Ten species of thrushes have been recorded in Georgia.

Eastern bluebird, Sialia sialis
Mountain bluebird, Sialia currucoides (R)
Veery, Catharus fuscescens
Gray-cheeked thrush, Catharus minimus
Bicknell's thrush, Catharus bicknelli (R)
Swainson's thrush, Catharus ustulatus
Hermit thrush, Catharus guttatus
Wood thrush, Hylocichla mustelina
American robin, Turdus migratorius
Varied thrush, Ixoreus naevius (R)

Old World flycatchers
Order: PasseriformesFamily: Muscicapidae

The Old World flycatchers form a large family of small passerine birds. These are mainly small arboreal insectivores, many of which, as the name implies, take their prey on the wing.

Northern wheatear, Oenanthe oenanthe (R)

Old World sparrows

Order: PasseriformesFamily: Passeridae

Old World sparrows, also known sometimes as weaver finches, are small passerine birds. In general, sparrows tend to be small plump brownish or grayish birds with short tails and short powerful beaks. Sparrows are seed eaters, but they also consume small insects. A single species of Old World sparrow is established in Georgia.

House sparrow, Passer domesticus (I)

Wagtails and pipits

Order: PasseriformesFamily: Motacillidae

Motacillidae is a family of small passerine birds with medium to long tails. They include the wagtails, longclaws, and pipits. They are slender, ground-feeding insectivores of open country. Two species of pipit have been recorded in Georgia.

American pipit, Anthus rubescens
Sprague's pipit, Anthus spragueii (R)

Finches, euphonias, and allies

Order: PasseriformesFamily: Fringillidae

Finches are seed-eating passerines. They are small to moderately large and have strong, usually conical and sometimes very large, beaks. All have twelve tail feathers and nine primaries. They have a bouncing flight with alternating bouts of flapping and gliding on closed wings, and most sing well. Eight species of finches have been recorded in Georgia.

Evening grosbeak, Coccothraustes vespertinus (R)
House finch, Haemorhous mexicanus (native to the southwestern U.S.; introduced in the east)
Common redpoll, Acanthis flammea (R)
Purple finch, Haemorhous purpureus
Red crossbill, Loxia curvirostra
White-winged crossbill, Loxia leucoptera (R)
Pine siskin, Spinus pinus
American goldfinch, Spinus tristis

Longspurs and snow buntings

Order: PasseriformesFamily: Calcariidae

The Calcariidae are a group of passerine birds that had been traditionally grouped with the New World sparrows, but differ in a number of respects and are usually found in open grassy areas. Four species of Calcariidae have been recorded in Georgia.

Lapland longspur, Calcarius lapponicus
Smith's longspur, Calcarius pictus (R)
Thick-billed longspur, Rhynchophanes mccownii (R)
Snow bunting, Plectrophenax nivalis (R)

New World sparrows

Order: PasseriformesFamily: Passerellidae

Until 2017, these species were considered part of the family Emberizidae. Most of the species are known as sparrows, but these birds are not closely related to the Old World sparrows which are in the family Passeridae. Many of these have distinctive head patterns. Twenty-six species of Passerellidae have been recorded in Georgia.

Bachman's sparrow, Peucaea aestivalis
Grasshopper sparrow, Ammodramus savannarum
Lark sparrow, Chondestes grammacus
Lark bunting, Calamospiza melanocorys (R)
Chipping sparrow, Spizella passerina
Clay-colored sparrow, Spizella pallida
Field sparrow, Spizella pusilla
Fox sparrow, Passerella iliaca
American tree sparrow, Spizelloides arborea (R)
Dark-eyed junco, Junco hyemalis
White-crowned sparrow, Zonotrichia leucophrys
Harris's sparrow, Zonotrichia querula (R)
White-throated sparrow, Zonotrichia albicollis
Vesper sparrow, Pooecetes gramineus
LeConte's sparrow, Ammospiza leconteii
Seaside sparrow, Ammospiza maritima
Nelson's sparrow, Ammospiza nelsoni
Saltmarsh sparrow, Ammospiza caudacta
Henslow's sparrow, Centronyx henslowii
Savannah sparrow, Passerculus sandwichensis
Song sparrow, Melospiza melodia
Lincoln's sparrow, Melospiza lincolnii
Swamp sparrow, Melospiza georgiana
Green-tailed towhee, Pipilo chlorurus (R)
Spotted towhee, Pipilo maculatus (R)
Eastern towhee, Pipilo erythrophthalmus

Yellow-breasted chat
Order: PasseriformesFamily: Icteriidae

This species was historically placed in the wood-warblers (Parulidae) but nonetheless most authorities were unsure if it belonged there. It was placed in its own family in 2017.

Yellow-breasted chat, Icteria virens

Troupials and allies

Order: PasseriformesFamily: Icteridae

The icterids are a group of small to medium-sized, often colorful, passerines restricted to the New World, including the grackles, New World blackbirds, and New World orioles. Most have black as a predominant plumage color, often enlivened by yellow, orange, or red. Fifteen species of icterids have been recorded in Georgia.

Yellow-headed blackbird, Xanthocephalus xanthocephalus
Bobolink, Dolichonyx oryzivorus
Eastern meadowlark, Sturnella magna
Western meadowlark, Sturnella neglecta (R)
Orchard oriole, Icterus spurius
Bullock's oriole, Icterus bullockii (R)
Baltimore oriole, Icterus galbula
Scott's oriole, Icterus parisorum (R)
Red-winged blackbird, Agelaius phoeniceus
Shiny cowbird, Molothrus bonariensis (R)
Brown-headed cowbird, Molothrus ater
Rusty blackbird, Euphagus carolinus
Brewer's blackbird, Euphagus cyanocephalus
Common grackle, Quiscalus quiscula
Boat-tailed grackle, Quiscalus major

New World warblers

Order: PasseriformesFamily: Parulidae

The wood-warblers are a group of small, often colorful, passerines restricted to the New World. Most are arboreal, but some are terrestrial. Most members of this family are insectivores. Forty-three species of wood-warbler have been definitively recorded in Georgia, and another species is classed as provisional.

Ovenbird, Seiurus aurocapilla
Worm-eating warbler, Helmitheros vermivorum
Louisiana waterthrush, Parkesia motacilla
Northern waterthrush, Parkesia noveboracensis

Golden-winged warbler, Vermivora chrysoptera
Blue-winged warbler, Vermivora cyanoptera
Black-and-white warbler, Mniotilta varia
Prothonotary warbler, Protonotaria citrea
Swainson's warbler, Limnothlypis swainsonii
Tennessee warbler, Leiothlypis peregrina
Orange-crowned warbler, Leiothlypis celata
Nashville warbler, Leiothlypis ruficapilla
Virginia's warbler, Leiothlypis virginiae (R)
Connecticut warbler, Oporornis agilis
MacGillivray's warbler, Geothlypis tolmiei (R)
Mourning warbler, Geothlypis philadelphia
Kentucky warbler, Geothlypis formosa
Common yellowthroat, Geothlypis trichas
Hooded warbler, Setophaga citrina
American redstart, Setophaga ruticilla
Kirtland's warbler, Setophaga kirtlandii (R)
Cape May warbler, Setophaga tigrina
Cerulean warbler, Setophaga cerulea
Northern parula, Setophaga americana
Magnolia warbler, Setophaga magnolia
Bay-breasted warbler, Setophaga castanea
Blackburnian warbler, Setophaga fusca
Yellow warbler, Setophaga petechia
Chestnut-sided warbler, Setophaga pensylvanica
Blackpoll warbler, Setophaga striata
Black-throated blue warbler, Setophaga caerulescens
Palm warbler, Setophaga palmarum
Pine warbler, Setophaga pinus
Yellow-rumped warbler, Setophaga coronata
Yellow-throated warbler, Setophaga dominica
Prairie warbler, Setophaga discolor
Black-throated gray warbler, Setophaga nigrescens (R)
Townsend's warbler, Setophaga townsendi (R)
Black-throated green warbler, Setophaga virens
Canada warbler, Cardellina canadensis
Wilson's warbler, Cardellina pusilla
Red-faced warbler, Cardellina rubrifrons (R)
Painted redstart, Myioborus pictus (P)

Cardinals and allies

Order: PasseriformesFamily: Cardinalidae

The cardinals are a family of robust seed-eating birds with strong bills. They are typically associated with open woodland. The sexes usually have distinct plumages. Eleven species of cardinalidae have been recorded in Georgia.

Summer tanager, Piranga rubra
Scarlet tanager, Piranga olivacea
Western tanager, Piranga ludoviciana
Northern cardinal, Cardinalis cardinalis
Rose-breasted grosbeak, Pheucticus ludovicianus
Black-headed grosbeak, Pheucticus melanocephalus (R)
Blue grosbeak, Passerina caerulea
Indigo bunting, Passerina cyanea
Lazuli bunting, Passerina amoena (R)
Painted bunting, Passerina ciris
Dickcissel, Spiza americana

Notes

References

See also
List of North American birds

Birds
Georgia